Floriana Football Club is a Maltese professional football club in the town of Floriana that currently plays in the Maltese Premier League. In all, Floriana F.C. has won 26 national leagues and 21 FA Trophies (present and longest surviving main knockout competition). It is also the only team from Malta to have qualified from the qualifying rounds to the first round proper of the UEFA Champions League, in the 1993–94 season.

History
Floriana Football Club was founded in 1894 with the inauguration of the football ground officiated by Queen Alexandra. The site was a cricket ground from 1890 until its conversion project. Together with St. George's FC, is one of the two oldest clubs in Malta. During that period, football in Malta was introduced by the British Servicemen who were stationed on the island, which was then a colony of the British Empire.

The club is affiliated to the Malta Football Association which in turn is a member of both UEFA and FIFA. The team's colours were green and red but after a friendly match against the Royal Dublin Fusiliers which plays in green and white, Floriana FC changed its colours to green and white. The team's nicknames are: Tal-Irish and Greens.

Floriana Football Club has won the major Maltese League championship 26 times and the FA Trophy 20 times.

Formation
Football was introduced in Malta at the end of the 19th century by the British troops stationed on the island. At that time Malta formed part of the British Empire and, the Island was the base of British forces in the heart of the Mediterranean. The forces' barracks, which were strategically located around the island of Malta, enjoyed large areas that were used as parade grounds, training areas and for sporting activities.

The sports practised by the soldiers were mainly cricket, hockey and football. The British forces in Malta were mainly stationed in Floriana, Cospicua, Mtarfa, Marsa and Sliema. The locals who were influenced by the soldiers stationed in the area were introduced to these sporting activities. The most popular sport amongst the residents of Floriana was football, however some also practised cricket and hockey. Floriana still has its hockey club, carrying the name Floriana Young Stars Hockey Club.

Club colours and mascot
Between 1894 and 1905 the club's colours were green/red quartered shirts, black shorts with green and red socks. The official colours of the club as we know them today, green and white vertical striped shirts, white shorts and green/white horizontal striped socks, were introduced in 1905. At that time the Royal Dublin Fusiliers were stationed in Floriana. During that year, three friendly matches were held between this regiment and FFC. At the end of the final match both teams exchanged their shirts and later the FFC changed their official colours to their green and white shirts. The regiment left the Island for India in that same year. The ties between Floriana and the Royal Dublin Fusiliers were so strong that the people hailing from Floriana were nicknamed after the Irish, "Tal-Irish".

The club's mascot is the lion, which features prominently on the club's badge since 1936 together with the Latin motto "Ex Ludis Virtus", meaning "virtue out of the game". In this regard the club's badge represents the fierceness of the lion together with the virtues of sportsmanship. The lion was chosen as the club's mascot for two general reasons attributed to history of Floriana.

First attribution is to the coat-of-arms of the Grandmaster of Order of St. John, Manoel de Vilhena, which has the lion on it. Vilhena was the mastermind behind the construction of a fortification suburg of Floriana (originally known as Borgo Vilhena) to defend the capital city of Valletta from land attacks. He even ordered the construction of a lion statue fountain, with his Grandmaster coat of arms being held by the lions hand, in the centre of Floriana's main square, St. Anne Square, which is still there today.

Second attribution to the lion is the statue of St. Publius who is the patron saint of Floriana. The St. Publius' statue has a lion with it which shows how Publius was killed for his Christian preachings.

The first game won by the team was confirmed on the feast of the patron's village St. Publius, on 13 April 1910, which is to some considered a divine confirmation.

2020 Win and COVID-19 national outrage 
On 25 May 2020 Floriana FC were crowned champions of the BOV Premier League for the 26th title in their history and their first in 27 years, following a shortened season by a legal notice from the health authority in Malta to stop all contact sports on the Island because of the COVID-19 pandemic. In June 2020 a vote was taken in the MFA Counsel and declared all those on top of the table in all participating divisions will be declared champions. Due to the COVID-19 pandemic, the season was ultimately stopped earlier and Floriana was crowned champions of the league.

Celebrations were then hosted in the Fosos in Floriana, where a mass gathering of supporters broke social distancing rules and broke several Maltese laws by not staying in groups of six of less. The event sparked national outrage within the public in Malta and was featured on nearly all Maltese national newspapers.

Domestic successes
Since the foundation of the Malta Football Association, in 1909, (fiv)and local competitions the club won a total of 108 honours, which includes 26 league titles and 25 Cup knock out competitions. The club has also achieved a number of impressive feats, such as four consecutive league championships, ten doubles (League plus Cup) and a League title with maximum points.

UEFA competitions
Over the years FFC participated in the various competitions organised by the European football body, UEFA, such as the:

UEFA Champions League
UEFA Cup Winners' Cup
Fairs Cities' Cup
UEFA Europa League
Intertoto Cup

In 1962, the club was the first to represent Malta in UEFA competitions in its Cup Winners' Cup against the Hungarian side Ujpest Dozsa. Over the years, FFC had the opportunity to meet some renowned European football clubs, including the likes of:

 Ipswich Town
 Inter Milan
 Sparta Rotterdam
 Panathinaikos
 Ferencváros
 Dundee United
 FC Porto
 Borussia Dortmund
 Hajduk Split
 Red Star Belgrade

On two occasions FFC made it to the next round, 1993–94 Champions Cup and Intertoto Cup 1999–00.

Youth sector
In 1987 the club founded its youth sector, Floriana FC Nursery (FFCN), which is affiliated to the Malta Youth Football Association. The club's youth sector may also be considered one of the most successful organisations of its type on the Island; not only has it produced a number of some of the finest footballers, but it has also won a number of league titles organised by the Association.  The following are some of the major honours won by FFCN:

06 / 07 UNDER 14 Knock out competition
U/14 League Champions – twice
U/16 League Champions – six times, four of which in a row, 1993 to 1997
U/18 League Champions – six times, four of which in a row, 1996 to 2000

Today all the major six Premiership clubs in Malta have at least two players forming part of their squad, which have been raised by the Floriana Youth Nursery.

Rivalries

During their history Floriana had three main rivals St. Georges FC, Sliema Wanderers and neighbors Valletta. The rivalry against St. Georges FC started from the very first of football in Malta circa 1890, and then Sliema Wanderers FC as now known as the old firm rivalry was at its peak from 1922 and until the late 1970s when the two sides dominated the Maltese football scene. Football hooliganism between supporters and direct conflicts were something usual.

Today the rivalry has declined. Recently Floriana won the 20th FA Trophy against Sliema. This triggered again the rivalry between both clubs as Floriana won 9 finals in this Cup Competition against The Blues. 

The rivalry against Valletta City is still alive. The fact that the two cities are near each other's the rivalry continues to persist and it is one of the most classic derbies in Maltese football. The matches between the two sides always attract big crowds to the stadium and the fans treat these clashes as cup finals.

Players

Current squad

Out on loan

Non-playing staff

Administration

Managerial positions

Honours 
 Maltese Premier League
 Champions (26) 20px: 1909–10, 1911–12, 1912–13, 1920–21, 1921–22, 1924–25, 1926–27, 1927–28, 1928–29, 1930–31, 1934–35, 1936–37, 1949–50, 1950–51, 1951–52, 1952–53, 1954–55, 1957–58, 1961–62, 1967–68, 1969–70, 1972–73, 1974–75, 1976–77, 1992–93, 2019–20
 Runners-up (13): 1922–23, 1925–26, 1935–36, 1937–38, 1953–54, 1955–56, 1965–66, 1968–69, 1971–72, 1975–76, 1991–92, 1993–94, 2010–11
 Maltese FA Trophy
 Champions (21): 1937–38, 1944–45, 1946–47, 1948–49, 1949–50, 1952–53, 1953–54, 1954–55, 1956–57, 1957–58, 1960–61, 1965–66, 1966–67, 1971–72, 1975–76, 1980–81, 1992–93, 1993–94, 2010–11, 2016–17, 2021–22
 Runners-up (12): 1934–35, 1935–36, 1955–56, 1959–60, 1964–65, 1973–74, 1976–77, 1977–78, 1978–79, 1987–88, 1988–89, 2005–06
 Maltese Super Cup
 Champions (2): 1993, 2017
 Runners-up (2): 1994, 2011, 2022
 Maltese First Division
 Champions (1): 1985–86
 Centenary Cup
 Runners-up (1): 2000

European record

Matches

League and cup history

References

External links
Official Website

 
Football clubs in Malta
Association football clubs established in 1894
Floriana
1894 establishments in Malta